The Corinthian League ran for eighteen seasons between its formation in 1945 and its merger into the Athenian League in 1963.

1945–46
The league was composed of:
Epsom Town (from the London League Premier Division)
Erith & Belvedere (from the Kent League Division One) 
Grays Athletic (from the London League Premier Division)
London Fire Forces
Maidenhead United (from the Great Western Combination)
Slough United (from the Great Western Combination)
Twickenham
Walton & Hersham
Windsor & Eton (from the Great Western Combination)

1946–47
Seven new clubs joined the league for the 1946–47 season:
Bedford Avenue (from the United Counties League)
Carshalton Athletic (from the London League Western Division)
Eastbourne (from the  Southern Amateur League)
Edgware Town (from the London League Western Division)
Hastings & St Leonards (from the  Southern Amateur League)
Hounslow Town (from the Spartan League Western Division)
Uxbridge (from the London League Western Division)

1947–48
One new club joined the league for the 1947–48 season:
Chesham United (from the Spartan League)

1948–49
One new club joined the league for the 1948–49 season:
 Worthing (from the Sussex County League)
Hastings & St Leonards resigned after a single match (a 6–0 defeat at Hounslow Town) due to difficulties with their ground. Their record was expunged.

1949–50
One new club joined the league for the 1949–50 season:
 Epsom (from the London League Premier Division)

1950–51
Two new clubs joined the league for the 1950–51 season:
Maidstone United (from the Kent League Division One) 
Tilbury (from the London League Premier Division)

1951–52

1952–53

1953–54

1954–55
One new club joined the league for the 1954–55 season:
 Yiewsley (from the Delphian League)

1955–56

1956–57
Two new clubs joined the league for the 1956–57 season:
Dorking (from the Surrey Senior League)
Wembley (from the Delphian League)

1957–58
Two new clubs joined the league for the 1957–58 season:
Dagenham (from the Delphian League)
Horsham (from the Metropolitan League)

1958–59
One new club joined the league for the 1958–59 season:
 Leatherhead (from the Delphian League)

1959–60
Two new clubs joined the league for the 1959–60 season:
Letchworth Town (from the Delphian League)
Wokingham Town (from the Delphian League)

1960–61

1961–62

1962–63

References